Yaritza Medina (born in Toa Alta, Puerto Rico) is a Puerto Rican actress, TV host, professional dancer, choreographer and athlete.

Among her first appearances on the small screen, she participated and won in a dance and modeling competition in the famous TV show Sabado Gigante in 2009. In 2011 and 2012 she was one of the principal dancers of the celebrity dance show Mira Quien Baila, she also participated in the reality show Nuestra Belleza Latina (2012), both produced by Univision. 

Medina has appeared in countless tours, music videos, music awards and reality shows, such as MTV Music Video Awards (VMAS), Latin Billboard Awards, Premios Lo Nuestro, Premios Juventud, Yo soy el Artista and La Voz dancing with various renowned artists such as Jennifer Lopez , Marc Anthony, Chris Brown, Rihanna, Maluma, Daddy Yankee, Luis Fonsi, Pitbull, Laura Pausini, Sean Paul, Carlos Vives, Yandel, Zion & Lennox among others. 

Medina was the featured dancer for the official video of the 2014 FIFA World Cup, titled "We Are One", performed by Pitbull, JLo and Claudia Leitte. In addition, she has been featured in multiple music videos, for example "Cheerleader" performed by Omi and "Shaky Shaky" performed by Daddy Yankee, among many others.

As a choreographer, she’s worked with Univision's Despierta América, Telemundo’s Un Nuevo Día, Teletón USA, La Banda, Coca Cola, and with a wide variety of international artists.

This multifaceted Puerto Rican was one of the hosts for the TV sports show "Republica Deportiva", broadcast by Univision. 

As actress, Medina portrayed the character "Lilly" in Telemundo's "Mariposa de Barrio" in 2017. In 2013 she portrayed "Roxy" in the soap opera "Cosita Linda" produced by Venevisión Internacional, and in 2014 she appeared in "Tierra de Reyes" produced by Telemundo. 

Recently, in 2019, she starred in the television sports reality competition Exatlón Estados Unidos, broadcast by Telemundo, where she was nicknamed “La Dura” because of her physique and never give up mentality. She was also chosen as one of the sexiest participants of Exatlon by "People en Español" magazine.

Medina now continues to develop as an actress, TV host and enters the world of fitness as a trainer, motivator and influencer with her new fitness program called Dale Mija.

Television

Music videos

References 

1989 births
People from Toa Alta, Puerto Rico
Puerto Rican television actresses
Living people